In mathematics, the Atiyah conjecture on configurations is a conjecture introduced by  stating that a certain n by n matrix depending on n points in R3 is always  non-singular.

See also

Berry–Robbins problem

References

Conjectures
Unsolved problems in geometry